George Barker (25 May 1819 – 13 October 1893) was an English first-class cricketer who played for Cambridge University.

Barker was born in Shipdham, Norfolk, and was educated at Bury St Edmunds and Trinity College, Cambridge. He was awarded a cricket blue, appearing for Cambridge University in three first-class matches in 1840. He died in Great Yarmouth.

Notes

1819 births
1893 deaths
Cambridge University cricketers
English cricketers
People educated at King Edward VI School, Bury St Edmunds
Alumni of Trinity College, Cambridge
People from Shipdham